The Liga Femenina de Baloncesto, also known as Liga Femenina Endesa for sponsorship reasons, is the highest level of league competition for women's basketball in Spain. It is the women's equivalent of the men's Liga ACB and is run by the Spanish Basketball Federation. The league was founded in 1964 and is played under FIBA rules.

Throughout its history 13 clubs have been champions; CB Godella-Pool Getafe (with both names), Ros Casares and Perfumerías Avenida have won the most championships, with eight.

Liga championship rules 
Each team has to play all the other teams in its division twice, once at home and once away. This means that in Liga Femenina de Baloncesto the league's regular season ends after all teams play 26 matches.

At the end of the league, the eight best teams in the standings start a play-off, pitting the first place team in the standings versus the 8th place team in the standings, and so on. There are three playoff rounds, each consisting of three-game series, and the winner of the finals round becomes the champion of the Liga Femenina de Baloncesto. This is similar to the NBA playoffs system, but shorter.

Each season, the two last qualified teams of the regular season are relegated to Liga Femenina 2 de Baloncesto and replaced by the two first qualified teams of this league.

Current clubs

History

Pre playoffs era

Playoffs era

Performance by club

Stats leaders

All-time top performances

Games played

Points

Rebounds

Assists

Records in a game
Most points
49 by Amaya Valdemoro (Salamanca Halcón Viajes) vs. Ensino Universidade on April 10, 1999
Most rebounds
25 by Natalia Urdiain (CBN) vs. Tony Roma's Real Canoe on February 14, 1998
Most assists
16 by Paola Ferrari (Sóller Bon Día!) vs. UNB Obenasa Lacturale on December 21, 2011
Most three-pointers
10 by Patricia Cabrera (GranCanaria.com) vs. Zamarat on March 28, 2015
Most steals
12 by Arantxa Novo (Yaya María) vs. Cortegada on December 9, 2000
Most blocks
8 by Vanessa Hayden (Perfumerías Avenida) vs. Yaya María on October 17, 2004
Most PIR
61 by Amaya Valdemoro (Salamanca Halcón Viajes) vs. Femenino Tres Cantos on April 1, 2000

See also
Spanish Queen's Cup
Spanish Supercup

References

External links
Official Site 
 Locos por el baloncesto femenino 
 "www.encancha.com" 

 

 
   
Sports leagues established in 1964
1964 establishments in Spain
 Professional sports leagues in Spain